The 34th Annual GMA Dove Awards were held on April 10, 2003 recognizing accomplishments of musicians for the year 2002. The show was held at the Gaylord Entertainment Center in Nashville, Tennessee, and was hosted by CeCe Winans and Steven Curtis Chapman.

The 34th Annual Dove Awards were broadcast on April 19, 2003 on PAX TV.  The Trinity Broadcasting Network also rebroadcast the awards show.

Performers
 Blind Boys of Alabama
 Big Daddy Weave
 Mark Schultz
 Nicole Nordeman
 Rock n Roll Worship Circus
 Souljahz
 Daily Planet
 Cece Winans
 Audio Adrenaline
 Paul Coleman Trio
 Jeff Deyo
 The Crabb Family
 Amy Grant & Vince Gill
 Joy Williams & Ashley Cleveland
 Yolanda Adams & Donnie McClurkin

Award recipients
Song of the Year
“Holy”; Nichole Nordeman, Mark Hammond; Ariose Music, Mark Hammond Music (ASCAP)
Songwriter of the Year
Nichole Nordeman
Male Vocalist of the Year
Michael W. Smith
Female Vocalist of the Year
Nichole Nordeman
Group of the Year
Third Day
Artist of the Year
Michael W. Smith
New Artist of the Year
Paul Colman Trio
Producer of the Year
Brown Bannister
Rap/Hip Hop/Dance Recorded Song of the Year
“All Around The World”; Fault Is History; Souljahz; Joshua Washington, Je’kob Washington & Rachael Washington, Chris Rodriquez; Warner Brothers
Modern Rock/Alternative Recorded Song of the Year
“Breathe Your Name”; Divine Discontent; Sixpence None the Richer; Matt Slocum; Reprise
Hard Music Recorded Song of the Year
“Boom”; Satellite; P.O.D.; P.O.D. (Traa, Sonny, Marcos, Wuv) Paul Sandoval, Marco Curiel, Mark Traa, Noah Bernardo; Atlantic
Rock Recorded Song of the Year
“40 Days”; Come Together; Third Day; Mac Powell, Brad Avery, David Carr, Mark Lee, Tai Anderson; Essential
Pop/Contemporary Recorded Song of the Year
“Holy”; Woven & Spun; Nichole Nordeman; Nichole Nordeman, Mark Hammond; Sparrow
Inspirational Recorded Song of the Year
“Here I Am To Worship”; Here I Am To Worship; Tim Hughes; Tim Hughes; Worship Together
Southern Gospel Recorded Song of the Year
“Don't You Wanna Go?”; A Crabb Collection; The Crabb Family; Gerald Crabb; Family Music Group
Bluegrass Recorded Song of the Year
“Walkin' and Talkin'”; 50th Anniversary; The Lewis Family; Wayne Haun, Joel Lindsey; Thoroughbred
Country Recorded Song of the Year
“The River's Gonna Keep On Rolling”; Legacy...Hymns & Faith; Amy Grant; Vince Gill; Word
Urban Recorded Song of the Year
“Meditate”; This Is Your Life; Out of Eden; Lisa Kimmey, Michael Clemons, Nate Clemons, Eric Roberson; Gotee
Traditional Gospel Recorded Song of the Year
“Holding On”; Amazing Love; Mississippi Mass Choir; Dorothy Love-Coates; Malaco
Contemporary Gospel Recorded Song of the Year
“In The Morning”; Incredible; Mary Mary; Warryn Campbell, Tina Akins-Campbell, Erica Atkins-Campbell, J. Campbell; Integrity
Rap/Hip Hop/Dance Album of the Year
The Art Of Translation; GRITS; Teron Carter, Stacey Jones, Ric Robbins, Otto Price, Kenne Bell; Gotee
Modern Rock/Alternative Album of the Year
The Eleventh Hour; Jars of Clay; Dan Haseltine, Charlie Lowell, Stephen Mason, Matt Odmark; Essential
Hard Music Album of the Year
Fireproof; Pillar; Travis Wyrick; Flicker USA
Rock Album of the Year
Lift; Audio Adrenaline; Mark Stuart, Will McGinnis, Ben Cissell, Tyler Burkum; ForeFront
Pop/Contemporary Album of the Year
Woven & Spun; Nichole Nordeman; Charlie Peacock, Mark Hammond; Sparrow
Inspirational Album of the Year
Legacy...Hymns & Faith; Amy Grant; Brown Bannister, Vince Gill; Word
Southern Gospel Album of the Year
A Crabb Collection; The Crabb Family; Mike Bowling; Family Music Group
Bluegrass Album of the Year
50th Anniversary Celebration; Lewis Family; Wayne Haun, Buddy Spicher; Thoroughbred
Country Album of the Year
Rise And Shine; Randy Travis; Kyle Lehning; Word
Urban Album of the Year (Tie)
Fault Is History; Souljahz; Tonex, Chris Rodriguez; Warner Brothers
This Is Your Life; Out of Eden; Lisa Kimmey, Donnie Scantz, Jaimie Portee, Nate Clemmons; Gotee
Traditional Gospel Album of the Year
Higher Ground; Blind Boys of Alabama; John Chelew; Real World/EMI Gospel
Contemporary Gospel Album of the Year
The Rebirth of Kirk Franklin; Kirk Franklin; Sanchez Harley, Kirk Franklin; Gospocentric
Instrumental Album of the Year
Hymnsongs; Phil Keaggy; Phil Keaggy, Ric Hordinski; Word
Praise & Worship Album of the Year
Worship Again; Michael W. Smith; Michael W. Smith; Reunion
Children's Music Album of the Year
Jonah, A Veggie Tales Movie Original Soundtrack; Kurt Heinecke, Phil Vischer, Mike Nawrocki, David Mullen, Steve Taylor, Monroe Jones; Big Idea
Spanish Language Album of the Year
Navidad; Jaci Velasquez; Chris Harris for Fun Attic Prod., Alejandro Jean; Word
Special Event Album of the Year
City On A Hill-Sing Alleluia; Caedmon's Call, FFH, Jars of Clay, Jennifer Knapp, Phil Keaggy, Nichole Nordeman, Bebo Norman, Fernando Ortega, The Choir, Third Day; Steve Hindalong, Marc Byrd; Essential
Musical of the Year
The Christmas Shoes; Donna VanLiere, Eddie Carswell, J. Daniel Smith; Brentwood Music Publications
Youth/Children's Musical of the Year
Meet Me At The Manger; Celeste Clydesdale; Clydesdale & Clydesdale Music
Choral Collection of the Year
More Songs For Praise & Worship 2; Ken Barker, Keith Christopher; Word Music
Recorded Music Packaging of the Year
Welcome To The Rock 'N' Roll Worship Circus; The Rock 'N' Roll Worship; Sam Noerr; Matthew Lloyd; Karen Mason-Blair; Vertical
Short Form Music Video of the Year
“Irene”; tobyMac; Alex Moon; Rick Kim; ForeFront
Long Form Music Video of the Year
Worship; Michael W. Smith; Michael W. Smith; Michael Sacci, Ken Conrad; Carl Diebold; Reunion

References

External links
34th Annual Dove Awards Nominees Announced
Billboard.com list of winners

GMA Dove Awards
2003 music awards
2003 in American music
2003 in Tennessee
GMA